Kelly Eugene Ratliff (born September 28, 1945 in Macon, Georgia) is a retired major league baseball player who played four games in his career, all for the Houston Astros in 1965. He struck out four times in four at bats. No non-pitcher has had as many or more at-bats in a career with each one being a strikeout. He never played the field.

References

1945 births
Living people
Sportspeople from Macon, Georgia
Houston Astros players
Cocoa Rookie League Colts players